Sayawun Tin Shwe (died December 2000) was a prominent physician and author in Myanmar.

He was a committee member of the Myanmar Writers and Journalists Association (MWJA),
and founded the Tin Shwe publishing house.

His widow, Aye Thant, established the annual Sayawun Tin Shwe Award in his memory.
This award, given with the assistance of the Myanmar Writers and Journalists Association, gives awards for new books to encourage the development of Myanmar literature.

Sayawun Tin Shwe was Medical Superintendent of the Htaukkyant Leprosarium, near Rangoon.
He wrote fiction as well as medical articles.

In 1963, Tin Shwe won the National Literature Award in the General Knowledge Literature category.
In August 1996 Dr. Tin Shwe of the Medical Research Department was a member of a delegation of Myanmar writers that visited Russia.
In June 2000 Tin Shwe was Chairman of the MWJA Health and Welfare Work Committee.

Bibliography

References

2000 deaths
Burmese writers
Burmese leprologists
1936 births
University of Medicine 1, Yangon alumni
People from Mawlamyine